My Beautiful Daughter is a 1950 Italian comedy film directed by Duilio Coletti.

Plot

Cast  
 Gina Lollobrigida: Lisetta Minneci
 Richard Ney: Massimo Lega
 Constance Dowling: Lilly
 Luisa Rossi: Gabriella
 Carlo Campanini: Don Fernando
 Luigi Almirante: Cav. Minneci
 Umberto Melnati:  "Fotoromanzo" Director
 Marisa Vernati: Stena Randi
 Mario Besesti: Sindaco Favarelli
 Mino Doro: Guidi
 Lilia Landi: Carla
 Carlo Hintermann: Livio Toschi
 Mirella Uberti: Lucia 
 Dina Perbellini: Miss Favarelli
 Odoardo Spadaro: Master of ceremonies
 Enrico Luzi: Sacerdote
 Silvio Bagolini: Photographer

References

External links

1950 films
1950 comedy films
Italian comedy films
Films directed by Duilio Coletti
Films about beauty pageants
Italian black-and-white films
1950s Italian films